Charles "Chuck" Burr (June 1, 1923 – January 13, 2015) was an executive and administrator in the AFL and in the NHL. He was the General Manager for the Miami Dolphins in their first season (1966). He was the Assistant General Manager of the Buffalo Bills from 1964 to 1965. He also was a Public and Media Relations Director for the Buffalo Sabres in the 1970s. Burr worked at the Buffalo Raceway for a long time after his AFL and NHL career. He died on January 13, 2015, in Getzville, New York, at the age of 91.

References

1923 births
2015 deaths
Buffalo Bills executives
Miami Dolphins executives